Frank Edward Wilson (December 5, 1940 – September 27, 2012) was an American songwriter, singer and record producer for Motown Records.

Biography
In 1965, Berry Gordy asked the producers Hal Davis and Marc Gordon to set up an office of Motown in Los Angeles. Wilson accepted an offer to join the team. In December 1965, "Stevie" by Patrice Holloway (V.I.P. 25001) was the first single released from the West Coast operation and featured Wilson in the songwriting credits. Asked by Gordy to re-locate to Detroit, Wilson went on to write and produce hit records for Brenda Holloway, Marvin Gaye, the Supremes, the Miracles, the Four Tops, the Temptations, Eddie Kendricks, and more. He became particularly important after Holland-Dozier-Holland left the company. Additionally, after leaving Motown, Wilson produced a gold disc earning album by Lenny Williams, former lead singer for Tower of Power, Marilyn McCoo & Billy Davis Jr., former members of the Fifth Dimension, Alton McClain & Destiny, New Birth and the Grammy nominated album, Motown Comes Home.

He also launched his own publishing firms, Traco Music and Specolite Music, Ascap and BMI companies. During the next four years, Wilson recorded, released and published more than 40 copyrighted compositions, including, "It Must Be Love", by Judy Wieder & John Footman, "Stares and Whispers" by Terry McFadden and John Footman, "Star Love" by Judy Wieder and John Footman, and "You Got Me Running" by Judy Wieder and Clay Drayton.  Earlier, Wilson had also tried his hand at being a recording artist himself, recording the single "Do I Love You (Indeed I Do)" for release on the Motown subsidiary label 'Soul.' Supposedly 250 demo 45s were pressed, but by that time Wilson decided he would rather focus on producing and he had the demos trashed. Somehow at least two known copies survived, one of which fetched over £25,000 in May 2009.

Because of the scarcity of the original single and the high quality of the music (it was one of the most popular records in the Northern soul movement), it has been championed as one of the rarest and most valuable records in history (along with other "impossible to find" records by such acts as Bessie Smith, Louis Armstrong, and the Five Sharps).

Wilson left Motown in 1976 and became a born again Christian.  He became a minister, traveling and writing books with his wife Bunny Wilson, and was also involved in the production of gospel music as well. In 2004, was awarded an Honorary Doctorate of Divinity from Vision International University in Ramona, California and founded the New Dawn Christian Village in Los Angeles.

Books 
Wilson is the author of The Master Degree-Majoring in Your Marriage and Unmasking the Lone Ranger, a best seller for men. Both were published by Harvest House Publishers. He conducted Unmasking the Lone Ranger and Master's Degree seminars nationally and internationally based upon his books. Wilson has also appeared on numerous television talk shows including, Two on the Town, The Other Half, and The Oprah Winfrey Show.

Early and personal life 
Wilson was born on December 5, 1940 in Houston, Texas to James Wilson and Samanther Gibbs. Mr. Wilson attended Southern University in Baton Rouge but only for one year, he had participated in a civil rights protest and during his sophomore year he lost his scholarship. While still in his teens, he moved to Los Angeles, California.

His first marriage was to singer Barbara Jean Dedmon, however she died in 1966. His second wife was Bunny Wilson, together they had four daughters including the author, Fawn Weaver. He also had one son from a prior relationship.

Wilson died on September 27, 2012 in Duarte, California, after a long battle with prostate cancer, at the age of 71.

Discography

Songwriting and song production highlights

Albums

Singles

References

External links
[ All Music Guide]

1940 births
2012 deaths
Singer-songwriters from Texas
Motown artists
African-American male singer-songwriters
Clergy from Houston
Musicians from Houston
Northern soul musicians
Deaths from prostate cancer
Deaths from cancer in California
20th-century African-American male singers
21st-century African-American male singers